ABB (from  ; formerly known as  International Bank of Azerbaijan), the largest bank in Azerbaijan, is an open joint-stock company whose shares are owned by the Azerbaijan state. Its head office is located in Baku.

History

ABB OJSC was founded on January 10, 1992, as a joint-stock bank. ABB is currently one of the leading banks in the South Caucasus region in terms of assets, customer base, and international operating portfolio. With 66 branches and 13 sub-branches in different regions of Azerbaijan, the bank provides universal banking services to private and corporate clients. The number of legal entities served by the bank is about 18,000 and individuals clients are more than 2.2 million. The bank employs more than 3100 people.

According to the Decree of the President of the Republic of Azerbaijan No. 1174 dated November 5, 2020 “On ensuring the activities of the Azerbaijan Investment Holding”, the Bank ABB Open Joint-Stock Company was transferred to the management of the Azerbaijan Investment Holding.

Service network

ABB closely participates in large-scale state projects in sectors such as oil chemistry, transport, communications, energy, etc. and various social programs. At the same time, it actively supports the financing of large, small, and medium-sized businesses.

In 1996, ABB established the processing card company "AzerCard", that served as a basis of card processing business in the country. In 1997, the Bank began cooperation with Visa and MasterCard, later the Bank expanded this activity and announced partnerships with such international payment systems as American Express, Union Pay, Diners Club, and JCB. The bank offers its customers a wide range of payment cards, such as VISA, MasterCard, American Express, and Union Pay. This bank is the first and only Bank of Azerbaijan to offer customers an opportunity to order American Express payment cards, as well as to hold operations with JCB cards.

ABB has the largest local network of ATMs consisting of more than 900 machines, and over 13,000 POS terminals located at trade and service points across Azerbaijan. For the first time ever in Azerbaijan, ABB provided pension and wage payments through payment cards. At present, the number of active payment cards of the bank is over 1.3 million.

In 2019, ABB introduced the multifunctional product Tamkart.
In 2020, the bank introduced ABB Miles cards to customers.

Supervisory Board
ABB's Supervisory Board includes following members: 
 Chairman: Shahmar Arif oghlu Movsumov
 Emin Zamin oghlu Huseynov
 Khalid Nuraddin oghlu Ahadov
 Matin Balasan oghlu Eynullayev
 Fakhri Yashar oghlu Ismayilov

Management Board
ABB's Management Board includes seven members: 
 CEO: Abbas Ibrahimov
 The First Deputy CEO: Ilham Habibullaev
 Deputy CEO: Vasif Akhmedov
 Deputy CEO: Taleh Tahirli
 Deputy CEO: Agshin Amirov
 Deputy CEO: Nabi Aliyev
 Deputy CEO: Elmir Habibullayev

Memberships
ABB is a member of the following professional organizations and systems:
 Azerbaijan Banks Association (ABA)
 Baku Stock Exchange (BSE)
 Society for Worldwide Interbank Financial Telecommunication (SWIFT)
 International payment system MasterCard International
 International payment system VISA International
 International payment system American Express
 International information system Reuters
 Azerbaijan-American Chamber of Commerce

See also

International Bank of Azerbaijan-Georgia
IBA-Moscow
 Azerbaijan
 Azerbaijani manat
 Banking in Azerbaijan
 Central Bank of Azerbaijan
 Economy of Azerbaijan
 List of banks in Azerbaijan

Notes

References

Battilossi S. Financial Innovation and the Golden Ages of International Banking // Financial History Review. 2000. No. 7. pp. 141–175.
Стратегическая Дорожная Карта по финансовым услугам в Азербайджанской Республике.
Утверждена Указом Президента Азербайджанской Республики от 06.12.2016 года. Баку, 2016. 59 с.
Lees F.A. International Banking and Finance. London: Macmillan, 1974. 419 p. DOI: 10.1007/978-1-349-02148-2
Robinson S.W.Jr. Multinational Banking. Leiden: A.W. Sijthoff, 1972. 200 p. Ruckdeschel F.B. Risk in Foreign and Domestic
Lending Activities of U.S. Banks // Columbia Journal of World Business, Winter 1975. 68 p
International Banking in the New Era: Post-crisis Challenges and Opportunities. Ed. by S.-J. Kim, M.D. McKenzie. Bingley:
Emerald Group Publishing Limited, 2010. 485 p.

Government of Azerbaijan
Companies based in Baku
Banks of Azerbaijan
Banks established in 1992
Azerbaijani brands